Donovan Reese Berlin (June 13, 1898 – May 17, 1982) was an American military aircraft designer and aircraft industry executive.  Among the many designs with which he is associated, are the Curtiss P-36 Hawk, Curtiss P-40 Warhawk and Fisher P-75 Eagle. His name is "synonymous with the development of military aviation". He designed aircraft that were safe, rugged and "a pilot's joy."

Early years
Berlin was born in Romona, Indiana and in his formative years, lived in Brook, Indiana. He attended Purdue University, graduating in 1921 with a bachelor's degree in mechanical engineering.

Aviation career

With his introduction to aeronautics, conducting early wind tunnel tests for the U.S. Army Air Corps at McCook Field, Dayton, Ohio, Berlin subsequently worked for Douglas Aircraft Company starting in 1926 as project engineer and chief draftsman. In 1929, he left Douglas to work at Northrop Corporation where he was assigned to the Northrop Alpha, Gamma and Delta development. In a controversial move, Berlin was released when he and founder Jack Northrop were in disagreement over the wing design of a new fighter. Berlin was quickly hired at Curtiss-Wright in 1934, beginning a long career with the company.

Curtiss-Wright President Ralph Damon hired Berlin, impressed with his experience working with metal construction at Northrop, a key factor in his rapid promotion to Chief Engineer. Berlin's first assignment was as project engineer on the company's new fighter aircraft design, bearing the nomenclature 'design number 75'. After first competing and losing to the Seversky P-35 in a fighter competition, Berlin persevered and his reconfigured design, initially known as the Y1P-36, and later, P-36 Hawk, won the U.S. Army Air Corps fighter competition in 1937. Consequently, the USAAC ordered 210 P-36A aircraft to serve as a frontline fighter. In 1938 and 1939, the P-36 was one of the premier fighters of the period.

World War II
With foreign orders, P-36 Hawk production exceeded 1,000 aircraft. The Hawk was used more extensively by the French Air Force, both during the Battle of France and by the Vichy French; and was used against French forces in the Franco-Thai War  (October 1940–May 9, 1941). It was also used by the British Commonwealth (where it was known as the "Mohawk"), and by Chinese air units. Several dozen also fought in the Finnish Air Force against the Soviet Air Forces.

Berlin continued to develop the P-36, mating it with a more powerful water-cooled Allison V-12 engine, moving the cockpit aft, changing the location of the airscoop and making other modifications. The revised design evolved into the experimental models: XP-37/YP-37 and XP-42, before ultimately, the XP-40.  The XP-40 won the fighter competition in 1939 held by the U.S. Army Air Corps.  Produced as the P-40 Warhawk, over 13,000 were eventually built, in a wide-ranging series of P-40 variants.  In similar fashion to the success of the earlier P-36, the P-40 was adopted by many foreign air arms, including the Royal Air Force where early models were known as the "Tomahawk", and later series, "Kittyhawk". One hundred and forty-five pilots became aces in the P-40.

Two years of research data gathered by Berlin in developing his XP-46 advanced fighter design including wind tunnel, cooling and performance tests, were sold with his permission to North American Aviation which used the data in the development of its P-51 Mustang fighter.

During World War II, Berlin was Chief Engineer and the head of design at Curtiss-Wright. A number of experimental programs were begun during  this period, including the revolutionary Curtiss-Wright XP-55 Ascender that never achieved production status, as well as the Curtiss SO3C Seamew, a floatplane that was adopted by the U.S. Navy, but had a troubled operational history. Although designed by George A. Page Jr., Berlin oversaw the design of the Curtiss C-46 Commando, the company's foray into civil and military transport markets. He also supervised the development of the Curtiss SB2C Helldiver, designed by Raymond C. Blaylock, the company's last major production aircraft series.

Frustrated with a lack of official backing for a new development of the P-40, Berlin left Curtiss-Wright in December 1941, and, at the request of the federal government, in 1942, he became Director of the Aircraft Development Section of the Fisher Body Division of the General Motors Corporation in Detroit. While at G.M., he designed the unsuccessful Fisher P-75 Eagle, first as an interceptor, later escort fighter, made up of components from a number of production aircraft. Although the concept was intriguing, in merging engineering and production elements, one of the main considerations was that "Berlin's reputation was such that any proposal from him had to be given serious consideration." In 1945, Berlin was named director of G.M.'s installation engineering section in Indianapolis.

Postwar
Berlin left General Motors in 1947 to join the McDonnell Aircraft Company in St. Louis as executive vice president, directing the design of several McDonnell jet fighters and the ramjet engines for helicopter rotors. During his tenure, he oversaw a number of significant projects, including the McDonnell F3H Demon for the U.S. Navy, along with the XF-85 Goblin "parasite" fighter and XF-88 Voodoo "penetration" fighter for the U.S. Air Force.

In 1953, Berlin was named president and director of Piasecki Helicopter in Morton, Pennsylvania. His time at the company was contentious, as he removed the founder and chairman of the board Frank Piasecki during a period ending in May 1956 that some called the "Berlin Hairlift". Berlin's takeover involved "cleaning house" in what industry observers characterized as a "family dispute". Berlin had the backing of the majority owners of Piasecki, including Laurence Rockefeller who felt that Frank Piasecki was lacking in business acumen. Piasecki Helicopter was renamed Vertol Helicopter in early 1956.

During his time at Vertol, Berlin's involvement with engineering led to the rescue of a floundering program, the Piasecki H-21 (U.S. Army CH-21 Shawnee), that eventually allowed the company to prosper. His continuing support of new rotorcraft designs for commercial and military markets was validated when the Vertol Model 107 won a U.S. Army design competition in September 1958. The Model 107, later named the Boeing CH-47 Chinook, became the Army's standard medium assault transport helicopter. By the end of the 1950s, Vertol was the largest independent manufacturer of helicopters in the United States. Berlin became vice-chairman and general manager of Boeing-Vertol when it became a division of the Boeing Company in 1960.

Berlin returned to Curtiss-Wright in 1963 as a vice-president of the corporate staff in Wood-Ridge, New Jersey, before joining W. Pat Crow Forgings as vice-president and general manager in Fort Worth, Texas. He ended his aviation career at E. F. Felt Company, an aviation components manufacturing company in San Leandro, California, shortly before his retirement to his home in Glen Mills, Pennsylvania. After a long illness, Berlin died in 1982, at age 83.

Awards and honors
Berlin was awarded an honorary doctorate by Purdue University in 1953.  In 1956, he was awarded the "Captain William J. Kossler, USCG Award", given for the greatest achievement in the practical application or operation of a vertical flight aircraft. On May 17, 2013, Berlin was inducted into the Niagara Frontier Aviation & Space Hall of Fame. The Claire Lee Chennault Foundation of the Flying Tigers made Berlin an honorary member, recognizing his contribution to the design and excellent performance of the P-40, their primary aircraft.

See also
 Aerospace engineering
 Aircraft design process
 Edgar Schmued
 North American P-51 Mustang
 Boeing-Vertol

References

Notes

Citations

Bibliography

 Angelucci, Enzo and Peter M. Bowers. The American Fighter. Sparkford, Somerset, UK: Haynes Publishing Group, 1987. .
 Boyne, Walter J. How the Helicopter Changed Modern Warfare. Gretna, Louisiana: Pelican Publishing, 2011. .
 Boyne, Walter. "P-75 Eagle: GM's Flying Frankenstein." Wings, Volume 3, No. 1, February 1973.
 Brindley, John F. French Fighters of World War Two. London: Hylton Lacy, 1971. .
 Child, H. Lloyd. "Faster than a Bullet." Saturday Evening Post, September 16, 1939.
 Christy, Joe. "Hawkman: An Exclusive Interview with Dr. Donovan Reese Berlin." Wings, Volume 3, No. 1, February 1973.
 Donald, David. American Warplanes of World War II. London: Aerospace Publishing, 1995. .
 Donald, David. The Complete Encyclopedia of World Aircraft. London: Orbis Publishing Ltd., 1997. .
 Ethell, L. Jeffrey. Aircraft of World War II.  Glasgow: HarperCollins Publishers, 1976. .
 Kinzey, Bert. The P-40 Warhawk in detail. Carrolton, Texas: Squadron/Signal Publications, 1999. .
 McDowell, Earnest R.  Curtiss P-40 in action. Carrolton, Texas: Squadron/Signal Publications, 1999. .
 Merriam, Ray. U. S. Warplanes of World War II. Bennington, Virginia: Merriam Press, 2000. .
 Norton, Bill. U.S. Experimental & Prototype Aircraft Projects: Fighters 1939–1945. North Branch, Minnesota: Specialty Press, 2008. .
 Pattilo, Donald M. Pushing the Envelope: The American Aircraft Industry.  Ann Arbor, Michigan: University of Michigan, 1998. .
 Serling, Robert J. Legend & Legacy: The Story of Boeing and its People. New York: St. Martin's Press, 1992. .
 Smith, Peter C. SB2C Helldiver. Ramsbury, Marlborough, Wiltshire, UK: The Crowood Press Ltd., 1998. .
 Trimble, William F. High Frontier: A History of Aeronautics in Pennsylvania.  Pittsburgh, Pennsylvania: University of Pittsburgh Press, 1982. .
 Winchester, Jim. "Curtiss SB2C Helldiver." Aircraft of World War II: The Aviation Factfile. Kent, UK: Grange Books plc, 2004. .
 Winchester, Jim. "McDonnell XF-85 Goblin". Concept Aircraft: Prototypes, X-Planes and Experimental Aircraft. San Diego, California: Thunder Bay Press, 2005. .

External links
 Curtiss P-40 Warhawk: One of World War II's Most Famous Fighters: A detailed overview of the history of the P-40 on TheHistoryNet.com
 The P-40 Warhawk
 The Hawk's Nest: An Online Resource for the P-40 Warhawk
 "Dr. Donovan R. Berlin induction" Niagara Frontier Aviation & Space Hall of Fame
 Donovan R. Berlin, 1921 student page, Purdue University

1898 births
1982 deaths
American aerospace engineers
Businesspeople in aviation
People from Indiana
Purdue University College of Engineering alumni
20th-century American engineers